RFC may refer to:

Computing
 Request for Comments, a memorandum on Internet standards
 Request for change, change management
 Remote Function Call, in SAP computer systems
 Rhye's and Fall of Civilization, a modification for Sid Meier's Civilization IV

Science and technology
 Regenerative fuel cell
 Replication factor C, a protein complex
 Radio frequency choke, a type of choke

Organisations

Governmental
 Reconstruction Finance Corporation of the US government, 1932-1957
 Royal Flying Corps, precursor to the UK Royal Air Force
 River Forecast Center of the US National Weather Service

Non-profit
Rosenberg Fund for Children, a charity

Sports
 Randers FC, a Danish professional football club
 Rangers F.C., a Scottish professional football club
 Ratchaburi F.C., a Thai association football club
 Reading F.C., an English professional football club
 Richmond F.C., an English rugby union club
 Richmond Football Club, a team in the AFL, the top-level Australian rules football league
 Romulus F.C., an English semi-professional football club

See also